The R60 is a provincial route in Western Cape, South Africa that runs along the Breede River Valley, connecting Worcester with Swellendam via Robertson. It also provides a high-speed highway link between the N1 and the N2 national roads.

References

External links 
 Routes Travel Info

60
Provincial routes in South Africa